{{safesubst:#invoke:RfD||2=Supper, Lord's|month = March
|day =  7
|year = 2023
|time = 23:58
|timestamp = 20230307235822

|content=
REDIRECT Lord's Supper

}}